is an action-oriented strategy video game released in 1990.

Summary
This video game was developed for the Game Boy handheld game console. The game's narrative is as follows: A peaceful nation has been invaded by an enemy army. The tank will roll forward on its own and climb up any wall that is only a single block high—anything taller and it will crash into it and turn around, taking damage. An airplane must be controlled in order to gather the blocks needed to climb the walls. The map is essentially a race to the top of a hill. Puzzle-solving and shooting enemy tanks are a part of the gameplay.

References

1990 video games
Copya Systems games
Electro Brain games
Game Boy games
Game Boy-only games
Scrolling shooters
Strategy video games
Tank simulation video games
Video games developed in Japan
Multiplayer and single-player video games